Yastıqobu is a village and the least populous municipality in the Sabirabad Rayon of Azerbaijan. It has a population of 230.

References

Populated places in Sabirabad District